"If I Fell" is a song by English rock band the Beatles which first appeared in 1964 on the album A Hard Day's Night in the United Kingdom and United States, and on the North American album Something New. It was written primarily by John Lennon and credited to Lennon–McCartney. "That's my first attempt at a ballad proper. ... It shows that I wrote sentimental love ballads way back when", Lennon stated in his 1980 Playboy interview. Paul McCartney stated that he contributed to the song: "We wrote 'If I Fell' together."

Structure
The song opens with an unrepeated introductory section sung by Lennon, followed by a standard "Tin Pan Alley" AABA form. Each verse preceding the B section (a.k.a. bridge or middle eight) has a slightly different ending, which creates a seamless transition between the two. The remainder of the song uses a two-part harmony, with Lennon singing the lower notes while McCartney sings the higher ones. It features Lennon's intricate chord changes: the key changes from E flat minor to D major at the end of the introduction, which is played with a series of descending barre chords; the rest of the composition uses mainly open chords, including an unusual D ninth dominant.

Recording and performance
Lennon and McCartney shared a single microphone "for their Everly Brothers-like close harmonies".

Like much of the Beatles' early work, the song was released in two different mixes for mono and stereo. Lennon's opening vocal is single-tracked in mono but double-tracked in the stereo mix.

"If I Fell" was a part of the Beatles repertoire during their US and Canadian tour in 1964. The group typically performed the song faster than the studio version, and Lennon and McCartney often sang it with barely suppressed laughter. On more than one occasion it was introduced as "If I Fell Over".

Single releases
"If I Fell" was released as the B-side of the US single "And I Love Her" on Capitol 5235. As the B-side, it reached number 53 on the Billboard Hot 100. It reached number 28 in Canada. The song was also released as a single in Norway, where it reached number one.

In the UK, it was released on 4 December 1964 as the A-side of a single (b/w "Tell Me Why") on Parlophone DP 562. The single was intended for export, but some retailers sold it in the UK anyway. It did not chart there and is generally not considered an "official" UK single.

Personnel
According to Ian MacDonald, except where noted:

 John Lennondouble-tracked vocal, acoustic rhythm guitar
 Paul McCartneydouble-tracked vocal, bass
 George Harrisontwelve-string lead guitar
 Ringo Starrdrums

Notes

References

External links

 

The Beatles songs
Song recordings produced by George Martin
Number-one singles in Norway
Songs written by Lennon–McCartney
Chet Atkins songs
Capitol Records singles
1964 singles
Songs published by Northern Songs
1964 songs
1960s ballads
Pop ballads